Juozas Ūdras (14 February 1925 – 24 May 1991) was a Lithuanian-Soviet Olympic fencer. He competed in the individual and team épée events at the 1952 and 1956 Summer Olympics.

He was a five-time Lithuanian champion in épée and a two time champion in foil.

References

External links
 

1925 births
1991 deaths
Lithuanian male épée fencers
Soviet male fencers
Olympic fencers of the Soviet Union
Fencers at the 1952 Summer Olympics
Fencers at the 1956 Summer Olympics
Lithuanian male foil fencers